Neelam Kothari Soni is an Indian actress and jewellery designer from Mumbai, known mononymously as Neelam. She made her acting debut with Jawaani (1984) opposite debutant Karan Shah. Since then she starred in various films alongside Govinda such as Love 86 (1986), Ilzaam (1986), Sindoor (1986), Khudgarz (1987), Hatya (1988), Farz Ki Jung (1989), Taaqatwar (1989) and Do Qaidi (1989). She starred opposite Chunkey Pandey in films Aag Hi Aag (1987), Paap Ki Duniya (1988), Khatron Ke Khiladi (1988), Billoo Badshah (1989), Ghar Ka Chiraag (1989), and Mitti Aur Sona (1989).

Early life
Neelam Kothari Soni was born in Hong Kong to a Gujarati Indian father Shishir Kothari and Iranian mother Parveen Kothari.
 As a child, she learnt to play the keyboard and danced Jazz Ballet. Her family has a traditional jewellery making business, making high-class pieces. She was educated at Island School, where she was a member of Rutherford house. After her childhood in Hong Kong, her family moved to Bangkok. Neelam was holidaying in Mumbai when she was approached by director Ramesh Behl. She decided to give acting a shot and signed for the film Jawaani (1984) alongside Karan Shah, Tina Munim's nephew. But the film was unsuccessful commercially.

Career

Acting
Kothari's performance in her debut film was noticed in film circles and she received offers. She later became famous in 1986 for her role in the film Ilzaam opposite another debutant, Govinda. She made a very popular pairing with Govinda and starred with him in 14 movies and some of their films include Love 86 (1986), Khudgarz (1987), Hatya (1988) and Taaqatwar (1989). She had 5 hits opposite Chunkey Pandey, such as Aag Hi Aag (1987), Paap Ki Duniya (1988), Khatron Ke Khiladi (1988), Mitti Aur Sona (1989)  and Ghar Ka Chiraag (1989), out of 8 films with him, the other 3 being Zakham (1989 film), Khule-Aam and a Bengali film, Mandira (film). She also worked in another Bengali film Badnam (1990) with Prosenjit Chatterjee.

She was also noticed for her appearance in the 1998 film Kuch Kuch Hota Hai, where she played herself as a VJ and in the 1999 ensemble family drama Hum Saath Saath Hain in which she played a supporting role. Her last film was the delayed release Kasam in 2001, opposite Chunky Pandey.

In 2020, she starred alongside Maheep Kapoor, Bhavna Pandey and Seema Sajdeh in a reality television series Fabulous Lives of Bollywood Wives as well as Season 2 (2022), both of which was streamed on Netflix.

Jewellery designing
Even while pursuing her career in acting, she was interested in jewellery designing and was involved in her family business. She pursued a formal course in jewellery-designing in Mumbai and, after quitting films temporarily in 2001, started out commercially on her own under the name Neelam Jewels. She opened a showroom in Mumbai in 2004. She then launched her jewellery store in Mumbai on 25 August 2011 under the name Neelam Kothari Fine Jewels.

Other works
Neelam featured in Bina Mistry's Hot Hot Hot music video, a song that is part of a compilation of dance hits in the 1995 BMG release, titled Channel [V] Hits: The Ultimate Dance Collection. The song became a hit when it was featured as part of the soundtrack of Bend It Like Beckham (2002).

Personal life
 
In October 2000, Neelam married Rishi Sethia, the son of a businessman from the UK. They got divorced soon after. After a brief relationship with actor Samir Soni, she married him in 2011. After 2 years of marriage, in 2013, they adopted a daughter and named her Ahana.

In 1998, Neelam was charged with the Wildlife Act and the IPC for the poaching of two blackbucks in Kankani during the filming of Hum Saath Saath Hain, along with co-stars Salman Khan, Saif Ali Khan, Sonali Bendre and Tabu. She was acquitted by the CJM court at Jodhpur on 5 April 2018.

Filmography

References

External links

 
 

Living people
Hong Kong people
Hong Kong people of Indian descent
Hong Kong people of Iranian descent
Actresses from Mumbai
Artists from Mumbai
Hong Kong film actresses
British film actresses
British television actresses
Actresses in Hindi cinema
Actresses in Bengali cinema
Actresses in Marathi cinema
Actresses in Kannada cinema
Actresses in Hindi television
British jewellery designers
People educated at Island School
British people of Iranian descent
British people of Gujarati descent
British actresses of Indian descent
British expatriate actresses in India
European actresses in India
Gujarati people
20th-century British actresses
21st-century British actresses
Year of birth missing (living people)